The Instituto Politécnico do Porto (Polytechnic University of Porto), also referred to as Politécnico do Porto (Porto Polytechnic) and P.PORTO (since 2016, for naming and branding purposes), is a composition of multiple polytechnic schools based in Porto region. The Porto Polytechnic developed as a metropolitan institution with schools in Porto, Matosinhos, Póvoa de Varzim, Vila do Conde and Felgueiras.

History 
Porto Polytechnic was created in Porto in 1985 and its objective was to relaunch the polytechnic studies in Portugal. The Polytechnic started with two schools: the School of Education and the School of Music. In 1988, the ISCAP (Institute of Accountancy and Administration) and one year later the ISEP (Institute of Engineering), two schools founded in the 19th century were integrated. Today, it is the largest polytechnic institute of Portugal, with seven schools and 15,729 students enrolled for the 2007-2008 school-year.

The Porto Polytechnic is organized as a confederation of polytechnic schools. In the school year of 2003/2004 the Polytechnic had 15,000 students, a third of them in its major college, the ISEP. It also had about 1000 teachers. 7000 students competed to enter in that year and 2000 entered.

P.PORTO rank fourth among first-choice higher education institutions, and fifth in number of students. The university ranks among top 500 European institutions as per Times Higher Education ranking in 2021.

Timeline 
In 1852, the Porto Industrial School, later called the Porto Commercial and Industrial Institute, is established.

In 1918, the Industrial Institute and the Commercial Institute separate formally. Their names, as we know them today, are created only 60 years later.

In 1975, the Porto Industrial Institute changes its name to Porto School of Engineering and is integrated in the university education system.

In 1976, the same happens with the Commercial Institute: it changes its name to Porto Accounting and Business School and is also integrated in the university education system.

In 1985, the Polytechnic Institute of Porto is established, integrating the newly-created Porto School of Education and Porto School of Music. The latter changed its name in 1994 to School of Music and the Performing Arts, so as to integrate other forms of art, besides music.

In 1988, both the Accounting and Business School and the School of Engineering are integrated in the polytechnic subsystem. Two years later, in 1990, the School of Management and Industrial Studies is created with two buildings, one in Póvoa de Varzim and one in Vila do Conde.

It is only in 2001 that this school unites under a new single building, located between the municipalities of Vila do Conde and Póvoa de Varzim.

In 1999, the School of Management and Technology  is established in Felgueiras and, in 2004, the School of Healthcare Technology of Porto is integrated.

Campus 
Porto Campus 1 is located in Asprela in the far north of the city and in downtown Porto.

Schools 

 ISEP - Porto School of Engineering
 ISCAP - Porto Accounting and Business School
 ESE - School of Education
 ESMAE - School of Music and Performing Arts
 ESTG - School of Management and Technology
 ESS - School of Health
 ESMAD - School of Media Arts and Design
 ESHT - School of Hospitality and Tourism

Research Centres 
P.PORTO has 24 scientific research groups in its eight Schools.

See also
List of colleges and universities in Portugal

References

 
Educational institutions established in 1985
1985 establishments in Portugal